Numbeo is a Serbian crowd-sourced global database of perceived consumer prices, crime rates, quality of health care, among other statistics. Data on Numbeo is not peer-reviewed, and could be inserted or altered by anyone accessing the website. It has been criticized for its inaccuracy due to its ease of statistics misuse and general disinformation.

Description 
Founded in April 2009, Numbeo claims itself to be a "collaborative online database" which enables users to "share and compare information about the cost of living between countries and cities". The Numbeo website is operated by Numbeo doo, a company registered in Serbia. The founder of Numbeo is Mladen Adamovic.

Criticism of accuracy 
In 2012, Columnist Alistair Walsh suggested in an article written for the website Property Observer, that Numbeo's information is based on what people say and should be taken with a grain of salt. This is because no third party check or audit on the accuracy of data exists.

Numbeo's ranking of crime-ridden cities is not based on any confirmed stats. Instead, it is based on ‘reviews’ left by anonymous users of the site, making it easy to quickly build an image of a city in either a extremely positive or negative manner. Comparison against other international city data sources conducted by Ray Woodcock in 2017 suggests that Numbeo is often very inaccurate and misleading.

In 2017, a Swedish man showed how easily Numbeo stats could be manipulated, by pushing the Swedish city of Lund to become the most dangerous city in the world on the website's "Crime Index Rate" in less than a day. Trulsson added that Numbeo should hardly be considered stats, as anyone can change the data, as many times as they want, in complete anonymity.

In 2022, a Numbeo claim that Bradford, England was "Europe's most dangerous city" went viral on social media and was reported on in British press.

Same for France, in 2022, a newspaper named Le Figaro used Numbeo's ranking to compare violence and insecurity and titled "Insecurity: Nantes, Paris, Marseille, French cities unscrew in the world ranking of the safest cities" without criticism on the method of calculation, which is based on ‘reviews’ left by anonymous users, even if numbers are not realistic, like saying France is more dangerous than Mexico. While Mexico have seen at least 13 journalists killed in 2022, no one have been killed in France.

See also
Boosterism
Deception
Propaganda

References

External links 
Official website

Collaborative projects
Crowd psychology
Deception
Misinformation
Social information processing
Wikis
Serbian travel websites
Online databases
2009 establishments in Serbia
Internet properties established in 2009